Ready for Romance is the third studio album by the German duo Modern Talking, released on 26 May 1986 by Hansa Records. The album spent five consecutive weeks at the top of the German chart and was eventually certified platinum by the Bundesverband Musikindustrie (BVMI) for shipments in excess of 710,000 copies in Germany. It also topped the charts in Austria and Switzerland, while reaching the top 10 in Finland, the Netherlands, Norway, Spain  and Sweden. It peaked at number 76 on the UK Albums Chart, becoming the band's only album to chart in the United Kingdom.

Two singles were released from Ready for Romance, "Brother Louie" and "Atlantis Is Calling (S.O.S. for Love)", both of which reached number one in Germany and charted within the top five in Austria, Sweden and Switzerland.

Track listing

UK edition

Personnel
 Dieter Bohlen – production, arrangements
 Manfred Vormstein – art direction, design, cover photo
 Matthias Kortemeier – design
 Didi Zill – artists photo

Charts

Weekly charts

Year-end charts

Certifications

References

1986 albums
Hansa Records albums
Modern Talking albums